Yacine Elghorri, also referred to as Elgo, is a French animator, illustrator, storyboard artist, conceptual designer and comic book artist. He worked in the United States on films and cartoons such as Futurama, Titan AE, Evolution, The Fantastic Four and Thru the Moebius Strip.
He has also contributed to the science fiction comics magazine Heavy Metal, creating two short stories in black and white.

Career
Elgo was born in Paris, France. After graduating from college, he went to the Ecole de l'Image Gobelins (Paris) film school to study animation, where he made two animated shorts for television and graduated as an assistant animator for 2D animation. Focusing on conceptual art and design, Elgo worked on a few television series ( Flash Gordon, Lucky Luke ) and drew comics for various French magazines.

In 1996 he moved to the United States to work in the film industry. He settled in Los Angeles where he worked for Rich Animation studios, DreamWorks and Twentieth Century Fox. Elgo pursued his career as a comic book artist drawing short stories for Heavy Metal Magazine and Marvel Comics in the Incredible Hulks 618 issue. He has also worked as a concept designer and storyboard artist on several films, television series and commercials such as: Titan A.E, Evolution (with legendary special effects creator Phil Tippett), Futurama ( season 1) and Seven Up.

In 2000, Elgo met and worked with French artist Jean Giraud (Moebius) on Thru the Moebius Strip, a 3D production. He has also worked with writer Jean Dufaux on a series of three graphic novels called Medina.

His works include collaborations with legendary artists such as Alejandro Jodorowsky and Philippe Druillet.

Elgo currently lives in Paris, France.

Bibliography

Comics
'HEAVY METAL', 1999 
'GUNMAN', Carabas editions, 2005 
'BESTIAL', Children's book, Carabas, 2006 
'FACTORY', 3-issue series, Carabas, 2006–2009 
'MEDINA', 3-issue series, Lombard, 2012–2015

Films and TV series
 Futurama 
  Titan AE 
 Evolution

References

External links
 Interview (in French)

American animators
American speculative fiction artists
Algerian speculative fiction artists
American illustrators
French animators
French comics artists
French illustrators
Living people
Science fiction artists
American storyboard artists
Year of birth missing (living people)
21st-century Algerian people